Oksner is a surname. Notable people with the surname include: 

Bob Oksner (1916–2007), American comics artist
Robert M. Oksner (1926–2017), American advertising executive